This is a list of oilfield service companies – notable companies that provide services to the petroleum exploration and production industry but do not typically produce petroleum. In the list, notable subsidiary companies and divisions are listed as sub-lists of their current parent companies.

Definition
Oilfield service companies may produce, maintain, and repair equipment used in oil extraction and oil transportation. In 2019, the global oilfield services market was US $ 267.8 billion.

List

Companies connected with oilfield services 

 DeepOcean
 International Logging
 Kongsberg Gruppen
 Rolls-Royce Holdings
 Teledyne Technologies
 Wärtsilä

See also
 List of oil exploration and production companies
 List of largest oil and gas companies by revenue

References

Lists of energy companies